The Union Club of Columbia football team was a football club composed of Columbia College students and alumni that operated from 1886 to 1887. It was the only school-related football team in 1886 after the varsity of Columbia was on hiatus from 1885 to 1888. Very little is known about the Union Club, its relation to Columbia College, and its reason for establishment and dissolution.

1886 season

In 1886, the Unions of Columbia football club joining the fledgling American Football Union for their inaugural 1886 season.  The Unions would compile a 1–3 record, all against AFU opponents, and outscored their opponents by a total of 28 to 23.  The AFU ruled that the November 6th forfeit loss between Brooklyn Hill and the Unions would not count towards the league record.  The 1886 team was composed mostly of Columbia College alumni, particularly from the 1883 and 1884 varsity squads.

1887 season

The 1887 Unions of Columbia College football team compiled a 0–3 record (all in the AFU) and were outscored by their opponents by a total of 63 to 2.  Sometime in the middle of October, the team was able to secure new players when the Crickets of Stevens Institute (who had won the 1886 AFU championship) decided to consolidate their team with the Unions.  On November 13, the Unions resigned from the AFU for an unstated reason, and disbanded their student alumni football team.  Speculation at the time for the team's disbandment was blamed on the club "not being able to stand defeat".  Another possibility was the alumni simply lost interest in the game, which was a common reason for dropping football at the time (this was the reason for Columbia's Varsity hiatus' in the 1880s and 1890s), or perhaps the most viable, the student sect of the Unions team was consolidated into the 1887 Columbia interclass teams, and there were two few alumni remaining to continue the season.

1888 season

The Union Club football team was reformed for the 1888 season as an independent, compiled a 2–1 record (approximately), and were outscored by their opponents by a total of 38 to 6.  The return of the Union Club is not well documented, but they seemed to now be mostly made up of Columbia students as opposed to alumni.  With the Varsity of Columbia returning from hiatus in 1889, there was no longer a need for separate football clubs and interclass teams, and the Unions were disbanded permanently.

Team rosters
In 1886, nearly all of the players in the Union Club were alumni or students of Columbia College.  For the 1887 season, however, the Unions of Columbia roster would also include the Crickets of Stevens, which were another alumni football team that represented the Stevens Institute of Technology.  Various members of other athletic clubs in the AFU also played a small part on the Union team.  The following players were a member of the Unions of Columbia football team between 1886 and 1888.  In 1888, restrictions from the new AFU constitution regarding fixed rosters slowed the influx or shifting of players of any club in the New York metropolitan area, and as such many of the Crickets or other players not affiliated with the college left the team.  Any additional information regarding the player's history will follow their years and position with the Unions.

C. Aldridge – 1887 Unions quarterback
H. Anderson – 1888 Unions rusher
J. Bacon – 1886 Unions fullback and rusher
Francis Blossom – 1888 Unions center rush and right end; Columbia Varsity letterwinner 1889
R. Bradley – 1888 Unions halfback and right tackle; 1888 Columbia sophomore team
Charles K. Beekman – 1886 Unions rusher; rusher for 1887 Columbia Junior team; 1888 Unions left tackle; Columbia Varsity letterwinner 1889
Caldway – 1887 Unions rusher
A. Cohen, captain – 1886/1887 Unions rusher and halfback
J. F. Congdon – 1888 Unions rusher
J.Cooke – 1888 Unions rusher
Cummings – 1886 Unions  halfback
DeWitt Weld? – 1888 Unions rusher (could be E. B. DeWitt, Columbia Varsity letterwinner 1882)
J. Dilworth – 1888 Unions rusher and center rush (could be R. G. Dilworth, 1888 Unions quarterback)
Read G. Dilworth – 1888 Unions quarterback (could be J. Dilworth, 1888 Unions rusher and center rush); Columbia Varsity letterwinner 1889–1890
Dimock – 1886 Unions rusher
Drummond – 1887 Unions rusher
D. Edwards – 1887 Unions halfback; Princeton football alumni and Crescent Athletic Club halfback 1887?
Field – 1887 Unions rusher (possibly Otis W. Field; Columbia Varsity letterwinner 1873)
Gardiner – 1886 Unions halfback
Alger C. Gildersleeve – 1888 Unions left end; 1888 Columbia Sophomore team; Columbia Varsity letterwinner and captain 1889
A. Halstead – 1888 Unions rusher
Howland – 1886 Unions rusher
J. M. Hewlett, captain – 1888 Unions quarterback and halfback; 1888 Columbia Sophomore team captain; Columbia Varsity letterwinner and captain 1889
Klapp – 1886 Unions rusher; captain and halfback of 1887 Columbia Junior team; 1888 Unions right guard
J. Langthorne (Longthorn, Longthorne?) – 1888 Unions left guard
Livermore – 1886 Unions rusher
Benoni Lockwood – 1886 Unions halfback; Columbia Varsity letterwinner 1883
E. Magee – 1887 Unions halfback
G. M. Martin – 1888 Unions rusher
R. A. Martin – 1888 Unions rusher
G. S. Nicholas Jr. – 1888 Unions rusher
C. O'Connor – 1888 Unions fullback
S. D. Pierce – 1888 Unions quarterback; 1888 Columbia Sophomore team
Provost – 1886 Unions quarterback; quarterback for 1887 Columbia Junior team
Phelps – 1887 Unions rusher
Richards – 1886 Unions rusher
W. P. Robertson – 1888 Unions halfback and fullback; 1888 Columbia freshmen team
Schuyler – 1886 Unions quarterback
Sevenoake – 1887 Unions rusher; Crickets Athletic Club 1886–1887; Secretary and Treasurer of the AFU in 1887
Sheldon – 1887 Unions rusher
E. P. Smith – 1888 Unions rusher; Columbia Varsity letterwinner 1890
H. Smith – 1886 Unions rusher
T. Smith – 1886 Unions fullback
Charles A. Stevens – 1886 Unions halfback; Columbia Varsity letterwinner 1883–1884 and 1884 captain;
R. Stevens – 1886 Unions rusher
Uhlenhaut – 1887 Unions fullback
William Ward – 1886 Unions rusher; Columbia Varsity letterwinner 1874–1876; played on 1887 Crescent Athletic Club
E. Winchet – 1887 Unions rusher
E. Woodbridge – 1888 Unions rusher

References

Columbia Lions
Columbia Lions football team
Columbia Lions football seasons